Rubens Martín Colombo Rivero (born 12 April 1985 in Mercedes, Soriano) is an Uruguayan footballer who plays as a striker.

Notes

External links
Martín Colombo at playmakerstats.com (English version of ceroacero.es)

1985 births
Living people
People from Mercedes, Uruguay
Uruguayan footballers
Association football forwards
Sportivo Cerrito players
Club Atlético River Plate (Montevideo) players
Expatriate footballers in China
China League One players
A.S.D. Città di Marino Calcio players
A.S.D. AVC Vogherese 1919 players